José María Bustillo may refer to:

 José María Bustillo (Argentina), Argentine general and politician
 José María Bustillo (Honduran), military and politician and a President of Honduras